Jacques Simon (1 October 1938 – 7 October 2021) was a French cyclist. He competed at the 1960 Summer Olympics in the 100 km team time trial and finished in seventh place. Between 1961 and 1977 he won at least 14 one-day races.

References 

1938 births
2021 deaths
Cyclists at the 1960 Summer Olympics
Olympic cyclists of France
French male cyclists
Sportspeople from Finistère
Cyclists from Brittany